Robert J. Shaw (born 24 December 1944) is an Australian professional golfer who played on the PGA Tour in the 1970s.

Shaw was born in Sydney. He turned professional in 1965.

Shaw played in Europe in 1968, winning the Spanish Open. Later in the year he successfully qualified for the PGA Tour at 1968 APG Tour Qualifying School. His best finishes in PGA Tour events were a T-2 at both the 1969 Tallahassee Open and the 1971 Greater Milwaukee Open plus a win at the 1972 Tallahassee Open with a 15-under-par 273 by two strokes over Leonard Thompson. His best finish in a major was T20 at the 1972 PGA Championship.

Professional wins (8)

PGA Tour wins (1)

PGA Tour of Australasia wins (3)

Source:

Australian/New Zealand circuit wins (2)
1968 New Zealand PGA Championship, Brisbane Water Tournament

Other wins (2)
1968 Spanish Open
1975 Jamaica Open

Results in major championships

CUT = missed the half-way cut
"T" indicates a tie for a place

Team appearances
World Cup (representing Australia): 1980

See also 

 1968 APG Tour Qualifying School graduates

References

External links

Australian male golfers
PGA Tour golfers
Golfers from Sydney
1944 births
Living people